Celeste Imperio is a famous Chinese restaurant in El Salvador. It was founded in 1994 and served as one of the pillars of modern Chinese food in this small Central American country. The most attractive characteristic of this Chinese restaurant is the Chinese style façade, which resembles those of ancient Chinese palaces. To date, this is the only Chinese style façade in El Salvador. Famous dishes from this restaurant are Chow Mein, Cantonese style rice, Chop Suey and fried wantan. The flavour and style of many of the dishes were modified to suit the taste buds of Salvadorans.

Origins

Celeste Imperio was founded in 1994. The cooking style of Celeste Imperio is based on the Cantonese style tradition from the small town Jiu Jiang (九江) in Guangdong province. However, seeing the need of making Chinese food appealing to Salvadorans, the restaurant modified some of their cooking styles, naming it Chinese-Salvadoran. Although there are a few modifications, the dishes still have the distinctive taste of the Cantonese style cooking. Many Salvadorans were attracted to the taste of this new hybrid cooking style and made Celeste Imperio their favourite place for a family dinner or lunch.

See also
 List of Chinese restaurants

External links
http://www.elsalvador.com/elsalvador/informacion/gastronomia/index.htm
https://web.archive.org/web/20070219131612/http://www.elsalvadorturismo.gob.sv/servicios.php?id=RES00278&ver=ok&tip=RESTAURANTES

Chinese diaspora in North America
Chinese restaurants outside China
Restaurants in El Salvador
1994 establishments in El Salvador